Jon Allen may refer to:

Jon Allen (diplomat) (born 1950), Canadian diplomat
Jon Allen (musician) (born 1977), singer-songwriter
Jon Allen (drummer), with the band Sadus

See also
Jonathan Allen (born 1995), American football player
Jonathan Allen (artist) (born 1966), artist and magician
John Allen (disambiguation)